Arnold "Arnie" D. Fielkow is an American sports administrator, attorney, and politician serving as the CEO and president of the Jewish Federation of Greater New Orleans. Until June 2017, he was the president and CEO of the National Basketball Retired Players Association (NBRPA). Fielkow was formerly a Democratic politician in New Orleans. In November 2006, he won a seat on the New Orleans City Council as an at-large member, and later served as city council president. He was reelected in 2010. In the fall of 2011, he announced his resignation.

Early life and education
Fielkow was born and raised in Appleton, Wisconsin, . He earned a Bachelor of Arts degree from Northwestern University and his Juris Doctor from the University of Wisconsin Law School in 1981.

Career

Sports administration 
He spent most of his career in sports administration. He served as Executive Vice President of the New Orleans Saints for six years, during which he presided over all administrative/business departments, including marketing, sales, regional development, governmental affairs, community relations, business media relations and youth programs.

He was fired by Saints owner Tom Benson when he refused to resign and sign a confidentiality agreement. Fielkow had been vocal in opposing the concept of having the Saints play in San Antonio.

Politics 
Following his firing, Fielkow was elected as one of New Orleans's two at-large council positions on May 20, 2006. He has chaired a number of committees including both the city's Economic Development Committee and the council's Youth and Recreation Committee. He has also co-founded the Fleur-de-lis Ambassadorship program with Tulane University president Scott Cowen. He has been a vocal supporter of public education, including the growing number of charter schools.

During the New Orleans e-mail controversies, Fielkow pledged to published 70,000 of his e-mail messages online.

Fielkow considered running to succeed Ray Nagin as Mayor of New Orleans in the 2010 mayoral election, but he chose to seek reelection instead. Fielkow was easily reelected to his position on the city council, with Mitch Landrieu ultimately winning the mayoral race.

On 22 August 2011, Fielkow announced his resignation from the Council effective 1 October. He planned to take a more lucrative job as CEO of the National Basketball Association Retired Players Association.

Election history
Councilmember(s) at-large (2), 2006

Threshold > 25%

First ballot, April 22, 2006

Second Ballot, May 20, 2006

Councilmember(s) at-large (2), 2010

Threshold > 25%

First Ballot, February 6, 2010

Footnotes

External links

 New Orleans City Council
 Arnie Fielkow's City Council webpage

Jewish American people in Louisiana politics
Living people
Northwestern University alumni
University of Wisconsin Law School alumni
New Orleans City Council members
Louisiana lawyers
Louisiana Democrats
Year of birth missing (living people)
21st-century American Jews